The Enforcers may refer to:

Enforcers (comics), a Marvel Comics villain team, enemies of Spider-Man 
New Enforcers, another group of Marvel Comics supervillains
Enforcers (SWAT Kats), an animated series
A criminal group in Jackie Chan Adventures; see Dark Hand

See also
 Enforcers or Enforcer (disambiguation)